Cryptophagus acutangulus is a species of silken fungus beetle native to Europe.

References

External links
Images representing Cryptophagus at BOLD

Cryptophagidae
Beetles described in 1827
Beetles of Europe